Zinsser SmartCoat 200 may refer to:
 Zinsser SmartCoat 200 (Berlin)
 Zinsser SmartCoat 200 (Lebanon)